Nancy R. Stocksdale (born June 22, 1934) is an American politician, who served as a delegate in the Maryland House of Delegates from 1995 to 2015.

Background
Nancy Stocksdale served as one of the delegates for District 5A, which covers portions Carroll County.  Stocksdale was first elected in 1994 along with Democrat Richard N. Dixon and Republican Joseph M. Getty.

In 1998, Stocksdale again won reelection, this time with the most votes of the three elected candidates.  The Republicans swept out the Democrats with Carmen Amedori winning the seat previously held by Dixon.

In 2002, the district lines were redrawn and votes were only allowed to select two candidates.  Stocksdale and Amedori won reelection defeating Democrats Kimberly Petry and Robert Wack.  Getty went on to serve newly elected Republican governor Bob Ehrlich as Policy and Legislative Director.

In 2006, Stocksdale again won reelection, this time with Tanya Shewell, when Amedori was appointed to the Maryland Parole Commission.

Delegate Stocksdale retired in 2014.

Education
Stocksdale attended Franklin High School in Reisterstown.  She later graduated from Western Maryland College in 1956 with her B.S. in Home Economics.

Career
After college, Stocksdale taught for over 34 years in the Baltimore County Public Schools system.  She raised a family of five children and one foster child while also starting several local businesses.  Nancy and her husband sold World Book Encyclopedia door to door throughout the 70's and into the 80's, sharing the love of learning with Maryland families.  She and her husband, William "Jack" Stocksdale rose to become managers of the DelMarVa tri-state area.  She has served 3 terms as the President of the Carroll County Republican Club.  Nancy Stocksdale was elected to the Carroll County Central Committee in 1990. During her term, she worked in Representative Roscoe Bartlett's office.

As a member of the House of Delegates, Nancy has been the assistant Minority Leader since 2007, Deputy Minority Whip from 2003–06, and served on the Appropriations Committee and the Joint Committee on Children, Youth, and Families.

Legislative notes
voted against the Clean Indoor Air Act of 2007 (HB359)
 voted against in-state tuition for illegal immigrants in 2007 (HB6)
 voted in 2005 to allow the operation of video lottery terminals in the state (HB1361)
 voted in 1999 to allow electricity customers to choose their providers, and other changes to laws governing regulation of electricity utilities (HB703)
voted for income tax reduction in 1998 (SB750)

Election results
2006 Race for Maryland House of Delegates – District 5A
Voters to choose two:
{| class="wikitable"
|-
!Name
!Votes
!Percent
!Outcome
|-
|- 
|Tanya Thorton Shewell, Rep.
|18,785
|  32.9%
|   Won
|-
|-
|Nancy R. Stocksdale, Rep.
|20,630
|  36.1%
|   Won
|-
|-
|Ann Darrin, Dem.
|9,489
|  16.6%
|   Lost
|-
|-
|Frank Henry Rammes, Dem.
|8,192
|  14.3%
|   Lost
|-
|Other Write-Ins
|57
|  0.1%
|   Lost
|}

2002 Race for Maryland House of Delegates – District 5A
Voters to choose two:
{| class="wikitable"
|-
!Name
!Votes
!Percent
!Outcome
|-
|- 
|Carmen Amedori, Rep.
|19,195
|  34.0%
|   Won
|-
|-
|Nancy R. Stocksdale, Rep.
|20,480
|  36.3%
|   Won
|-
|-
|Kimberly J. Petry, Dem.
|6,195
|  11.0%
|   Lost
|-
|-
|Robert P. Wack, Dem.
|10,520
|  18.6%
|   Lost
|-
|Other Write-Ins
|49
|  0.1%
|   Lost
|}

1998 Race for Maryland House of Delegates – District 5A
Voters to choose three:
{| class="wikitable"
|-
!Name
!Votes
!Percent
!Outcome
|-
|- 
|Carmen Amedori, Rep.
|21,969
|  24%
|   Won
|-
|-
|Nancy R. Stocksdale, Rep.
|27,665
|  30%
|   Won
|-
|-
|Joseph M. Getty, Rep.
|25,114
|  27%
|   Won
|-
|-
|Ellen Willis Miller, Dem.
|16,735
|  18%
|   Lost
|}

References and notes

External links
http://www.msa.md.gov/msa/mdmanual/06hse/html/msa12309.html
http://www.congress.org/congressorg/bio/?id=4211&lvl=L&chamber=H
https://web.archive.org/web/20091026222805/http://geocities.com/pollyN2/

1934 births
Living people
People from Carroll County, Maryland
Republican Party members of the Maryland House of Delegates
People from Owings Mills, Maryland
Women state legislators in Maryland
People from Reistertown, Maryland
Western Maryland College alumni
21st-century American politicians
21st-century American women politicians